Alfred Kingcome Newman (27 April 1849 – 3 April 1924) was the mayor of Wellington, New Zealand, in 1909–1910, and a Member of Parliament.

Early life

Newman was born in Madras, India, in 1849. The family migrated to New Zealand in 1853 and farmed at Waipukurau. He received his primary education in the Hawke's Bay Region and Auckland, and travelled in 1863 to receive his secondary education in Bath, England. Newman became a doctor of medicine and returned to New Zealand in 1875.

Political career

Newman was a Wellington City Councillor from 1881 to 1885. He was Mayor of Wellington in 1909–1910.

At the nomination meeting, Thomas Dwan, Alfred Newman and Henry Bunny were proposed as candidates, with Dwan winning the show of hands. At the election on 14 May 1884, Newman, Bunny and Dwan received 636, 379 and 121 votes, respectively.

The Thorndon electorate was abolished at the end of the parliamentary term in 1890. He was defeated in  when he stood for Otaki.

From 1909, he belonged to the Reform Party.

He was a member of the Legislative Council from 1 June 1923 to when he died on 3 April 1924, and for many years was on the Wellington Education Board, the Wellington College Board of Governors and the Senate of the University of New Zealand.

Newman Terrace in Wellington is named after him.

Notes

References

No Mean City by Stuart Perry (1969, Wellington City Council) includes a paragraph and a portrait or photo for each mayor

|-

|-

1849 births
1924 deaths
Members of the New Zealand House of Representatives
Reform Party (New Zealand) MPs
New Zealand MPs for Wellington electorates
New Zealand MPs for Hutt Valley electorates
Mayors of Wellington
Wellington City Councillors
Wellington Harbour Board members
Members of the New Zealand Legislative Council
19th-century New Zealand medical doctors
Unsuccessful candidates in the 1881 New Zealand general election
Unsuccessful candidates in the 1896 New Zealand general election
Unsuccessful candidates in the 1899 New Zealand general election
19th-century New Zealand politicians